Malala-Ambilikala Lagoons are two interconnected coastal water-bodies located inside the Bundala National Park, Hambantota District in the Southern Province, Sri Lanka. The Malala-Ambilikala Lagoons are two of the three key lagoons located within the Bundala Ramsar wetlands.

Features 
The Malala-Ambilikala Lagoons system is the main lagoon system situated in one of the three Ramsar sites within Sri Lanka, the Bundala National Park.
While the Ambilikala lagoon is an inland freshwater lagoon with no direct outfall to the sea, the Malala (Saltern ), as its name implies, is a lagoon which has a direct connection with the Indian Ocean at the Malala sea outfall.
Inputs to the Ambilikala and Malala lagoons include agricultural drainage, runoff with cattle refuse, and salt water when the sand bar between the Malala Lagoon and the sea is breached. Malala lagoon receives freshwater from Malala Aara, Heen Aara and Palalgawala Aara streams, surface drainage and overflow from Nadada wewa tank. The main freshwater supplies of Ambilikala lagoon are streams such as Weligatta Aara, Sundiram Aara, Ethuklbokka Aara, Right Bank Channel of the Lunugamvehera Reservoir, Kirindi Oya Irrigation and Settlement Project (KOISP), and surface drainage and overflow from tanks such as Bandagiriya, Keligama wewa, Julgamuwala (Divulgama) wewa, Arabedda, Udamalala wewa.

Environmental problems 
The hydrological, ecological and biological condition of the Malala and Ambilikala lagoon systems started to change rapidly with irrigation, agriculture, and human settlements in the upstream area, especially water quality problems affected the functioning of the lagoon ecosystem. The Malala and Ambilikala lagoons were severely affected by the modified drainage flows from the Kirindi Oya Irrigation Settlement Project and the Bandagiriya irrigation scheme. An extinction of species and changes to habitat diversity were also observed in the lagoon system due to water quality changes. In addition to that, Increasing inflows and decreasing salinity in the lagoon water has caused severe socio-economic problems to the people who relies lagoon resources for livelihoods. A decline in shrimp (Metapenaeus sp. and Penaeus sp.) and new fish species (Alectis ciliaris and Etroplus suratensis) with less commercial value were observed due to a significant decrease in salinity levels.

Research 
A number of studies have been carried out recently on ecohydrology and socio-hydrology of the Malala and Ambilikala lagoons.

 Comparative study of effect of agricultural runoff on Malala - Embilikala lagoons in Sri Lanka.
 Irrigation Water Management and the Bundala National Park.
 Human impact and the status of water quality in the Bundala Ramsar wetland lagoon system in Southern Sri Lanka.
 Finding a long-lasting solution for problems created by increased flow into Malala-Embilikala Lagoon system.

References

Bodies of water of Hambantota District
Lagoons of Sri Lanka